Phyllidiopsis bayi is a species of sea slug, a dorid nudibranch, a shell-less marine gastropod mollusk in the family Phyllidiidae.

Distribution 
This species was described from 38 m depth at Point La Revellata, Punta Bianca, Corsica .

Description
This nudibranch has a translucent white dorsum with brown flecks of pigment. It is a small Phyllidiid, growing to 8 mm in length, although the specimens were immature and the maximum size is unknown.

Diet
This species feeds on a sponge.

References

Phyllidiidae
Gastropods described in 1983